Şəhriyar (also, Shagriyar) is a village in the Masally Rayon of Azerbaijan.  The village forms part of the municipality of Əminli.

References 

Populated places in Masally District